The 2022 European Junior and U23 Canoe Slalom Championships took place in České Budějovice, Czech Republic from 11 to 14 August 2022 under the auspices of the European Canoe Association (ECA). It was the 24th edition of the competition for Juniors (U18) and the 20th edition for the Under 23 category. The Czech Republic hosted the event for the first time. A total of 20 medal events were held.

Russia and Belarus were excluded from participation due to the 2022 Russian invasion of Ukraine.

Medal summary

Men

Canoe

Junior

U23

Kayak

Junior

U23

Women

Canoe

Junior

U23

Kayak

Junior

U23

Medal table

References

External links
European Canoe Association
Official website

European Junior and U23 Canoe Slalom Championships
European Junior and U23 Canoe Slalom Championships
European Junior and U23 Canoe Slalom Championships
European Junior and U23 Canoe Slalom Championships
European Junior and U23 Canoe Slalom Championships
Sport in České Budějovice